Ryan MacBeth (born 15 November 1997) is an Irish cricketer. He made his first-class debut for North West Warriors in the 2017 Inter-Provincial Championship on 30 August 2017. He made his List A debut for North West Warriors in the 2018 Inter-Provincial Cup on 16 July 2018. He made his Twenty20 debut on 25 June 2021, for North West Warriors in the 2021 Inter-Provincial Trophy.

References

External links
 

1997 births
Living people
Irish cricketers
North West Warriors cricketers
People from Letterkenny